Bhuvaneswari is an Indian model, film and television actress., Chittoor, Andhra Pradesh) .She is known for her work in South Indian cinema and in television. She has received critical acclaim for her antagonist roles in several soap operas. She rose to stardom with the 2003 Tamil film, Boys in which she played Rani, the prostitute. Kurkure is her first film in a lead role.

Filmography

Television

References

External links
 

Indian soap opera actresses
Indian television actresses
Indian film actresses
Actresses in Tamil cinema
Actresses in Telugu cinema
Actresses in Malayalam cinema
Actresses in Kannada cinema
Actresses in Hindi cinema
20th-century Indian actresses
Living people
21st-century Indian actresses
Actresses in Hindi television
Actresses in Tamil television
Year of birth missing (living people)